Hamilton Shirts, or Hamilton, is an American shirtmaker.  It produces and sells ready-to-wear shirts and two types of men's custom shirts, bespoke and made-to-measure.  All shirts are made in Hamilton's workshop in Houston, Texas.  Hamilton shirts are sold at its Houston headquarters, online and through luxury retailers such as Barneys New York.

History

Founded in 1883, and now in its fourth generation of family ownership, Hamilton is Houston's oldest family owned business.

Fabrics 

Some Hamilton fabrics are double-ply and derived from extra long staple cotton.

References

External links
 Official Website

Clothing brands of the United States
Companies based in Houston
Clothing retailers of the United States